Courtenay Airpark Water Aerodrome  is located adjacent to Courtenay, British Columbia, Canada.

See also
 List of airports on Vancouver Island

References

Seaplane bases in British Columbia
Courtenay, British Columbia
Transport on Vancouver Island
Registered aerodromes in British Columbia